Weer Rajendra Rishi (September 23, 1917 – December 1, 2002) was an Indian linguist, diplomatic translator, and Romani studies scholar.

Rishi was born Waliati Ram Rishi in Makarampur, Punjab on September 23, 1917. He married in 1938 and entered the civil service soon thereafter. He changed his given names to Weer Rajendra in 1948. He completed an MA in Russian language and literature, and in 1950, another MA in English at Nagpur University.

Rishi worked in the Indian Embassy at Moscow (1950–52) and later, at the Indian High Commissions at Singapore (1962–65) and London (1969–71). His Russian language skills allowed him to work as interpreter for various Soviet dignitaries including Khrushchev, Marshal Bulganin, Marshal Voroshilov, Marshal Zakharov and Prime Minister Alexei Kosygin. He also served as an interpreter for the ex-President of India, Dr. Rajendra Prasad, on an official visit to the Soviet Union in 1960. Rishi retired from the Indian Foreign Service in 1973.

Rishi then served as the Director of the Indian Institute of Romani Studies at Chandigarh and the editor of Roma - Half-Yearly Journal on the Life, Language and Culture of Roma. He was later named Honorary President of the International Romani Union.

He died in Chandigarh on December 1, 2002, aged 85.

Honours
Rishi received India's Padma Shri award in 1970. He also received a National Millennium Award at the Millennium World Hindi Conference in 2000.

Bibliography
 Hindi translation of Alexander Pushkin's poem The Gypsies (1955)
 Russian-Hindi Dictionary, with foreword by the late Pandit Jawaharlal Nehru (Naʼī Dihlī : Sāhitya Akādemī, 1957)
 Russian Grammar [in Hindi]
 Russian Folklore [in Hindi]
 Marriages of the Orient (Singapore: Chopmen Enterprises, 1970)
 History of Russian literature [in Hindi] (1972)
 Roma - The Panjabi Emigrants in Europe, Central and Middle Asia, the USSR, and the Americas  (Patiala: Punjabi University, 1976 & 1996)
 Multilingual Romani Dictionary [Romani/English/Hindi/Russian/French] (Chandigarh, India: Roma Publications, 1974)
 Romani-Punjabi-English Conversation Book(Patial, India: Language Dept., Punjab, 1980)
 Romani-Punjabi-English Dictionary (Patial, India: Language Dept., Punjab, 1981)
 India & Russia - Linguistic & Cultural Affinity (Chandigarh, India: Roma Publications, 1982)
 Gandamula To Sumeru [his autobiography]  (Chandigarh, India: Roma Publications, 1992)
 Learn Romani - set of 20 lessons

References

External links 
 Website of Indian Institute of Romani Studies, founded by Dr. W.R. Rishi

Linguists of Romani
Recipients of the Padma Shri in literature & education
People from Punjab, India
Romani studies
1917 births
2002 deaths
Indian expatriates in the Soviet Union
Indian expatriates in Singapore